Talanga lucretila is a moth in the family Crambidae. It was described by Charles Swinhoe in 1901. It is found on the Solomon Islands.

The wings are pure white with a chestnut-brown band from the costa of forewings beyond the middle to the lower end of the cell, where it joins a similarly coloured narrower band which curves inwards from the costa near the apex and then extends to the hindmargin at two thirds from the base. The first band has a whitish line running through it, the second is followed by a whitish line and a broad marginal orange band with a whitish line dividing it. The hindwings have a large orange-brown patch in the centre of the disc, extending to the outer margin, containing a metallic blue band near its inner side, and three black spots on the margin, sprinkled with metallic blue scales.

References

Moths described in 1901
Spilomelinae